Gurchak (also Romanized as Gūrchak) is a village in Kuhsar Rural District, in the Central District of Shazand County, Markazi Province, Iran. At the 2006 census, its population was 163, in 36 families.

References 

Populated places in Shazand County